Cope Citizen is the debut album by American recording artist Citizen Cope. It was recorded in late 1991 and early 1992 and released in 1992 limited to 500 copies.

Track listing

References

1992 debut albums
Citizen Cope albums